Intelsat III F-8 was a communications satellite owned by Intelsat. The satellite had an estimated useful life of 5 years.

Design 
The last of eight Intelsat III satellites to be launched, Intelsat III F-8 was built by TRW. It was a  spacecraft equipped with two transponders to be powered by body-mounted solar cells generating 183 watts of power. It had a design life of five years and carried an SVM-2 apogee motor for propulsion.

Launch 
Intelsat III F-8 was launched on a Delta M rocket, flying from Launch Complex 17A at the Cape Canaveral Air Force Station. The launch took place on July 23, 1970, with the spacecraft bound for a geosynchronous transfer orbit.

The Intelsat III F-8 was lost due to a malfunction during the apogee motor firing.  Communications stopped 14.5 seconds into the planned 27 second apogee motor burn.

See also

 1970 in spaceflight

References

Intelsat satellites
Spacecraft launched in 1970
1969 in spaceflight
Satellite launch failures